Iyanla: Fix My Life is an American reality television series hosted by Yoruba priestess, life coach and relationship expert Iyanla Vanzant on the Oprah Winfrey Network. A sneak preview episode aired on June 2, 2012, and the series debuted with a two-part series premiere on September 15 and September 16, 2012.

On March 17, 2021, it was announced that the eleventh and final season will premiere on April 10, 2021. It was also announced that the series would conclude with a two-hour farewell special on May 22, 2021.

Background
Iyanla: Fix My Life features Vanzant helping people overcome difficulties in their lives. Each episode focuses on a specific problem posed by the story of one guest (or group of guests), with pre-taped production pieces at the guest's home and interviews with Iyanla that provide commentary throughout the show. Iyanla attempts to bring a different perspective to the situation and updates are provided to viewers at the close of each episode regarding the guest's progress since the date of filming.

Episodes

Season 1 (2012)
The first season of Iyanla: Fix My Life aired weekly on the Oprah Winfrey Network on Saturdays at 10/9c. A sneak preview episode aired on June 2, 2012, with the two-part series premiere on September 15, 2012, and September 16, 2012.

Season 2 (2013)
The second season of Iyanla: Fix My Life aired weekly on the Oprah Winfrey Network on Saturdays at 9/8c. Season 2 premiered on April 13, 2013, with a special 90-minute episode featuring DMX.

Season 3 (2013)
The third season of Iyanla: Fix My Life aired weekly on the Oprah Winfrey Network on Saturdays at 9/8c. Season 3 premiered on July 27, 2013, with an episode featuring R&B recording artist Syleena Johnson. Season 3 returned on November 2, 2013, with an episode featuring football player Terrell Owens.

Season 4 (2014)
The fourth season of Iyanla: Fix My Life began airing on Saturday May 10, 2014 at 9/8c, with an episode featuring Saigon and Erica Jean from the reality series Love & Hip Hop.

Season 5 (2015)
The fifth season of Iyanla: Fix My Life began on Saturday, March 28, 2015 at 9/8c, beginning with a special episode that features Karrueche Tran.

Season 6 (2016)
The sixth season of Iyanla: Fix My Life premiered on Saturday, September 10, 2016 at 9/8c on OWN.

Season 7 (2017)
The seventh season of Iyanla: Fix My Life premiered on Saturday, April 15, 2017 at 9/8c, beginning with an episode that featured Keyshia Cole's older sister Neffe and her husband Soullow. Season 7 returned on September 30, featuring rapper of Hot Boys fame's Turk and his wife Erica.

Season 8 (2018)

The eighth season of Iyanla: Fix My Life premiered on Saturday, March 3, 2018 at 9/8c, beginning with an episode featuring Kamiyah Mobley, who was kidnapped at birth.

Season 9 (2019)
The ninth season of Iyanla: Fix My Life premiered on Saturday, January 12, 2019 at 9/8c, with an episode featuring reality stars Althea ("Love & Hip Hop"), Dutchess ("Black Ink Crew") and Minyon ("Bridezillas").

Season 10 (2020-21)
The tenth season of Iyanla: Fix My Life premiered on Saturday, October 31, 2020 at 9/8c. On October 29, 2020, Vanzant announced that this season will be her last and the premiere will feature Love & Hip Hop star Shay Johnson and her family.

Specials

Reception
Iyanla, Fix My Life debuted to largely positive reviews by critics. As writer and columnist Nancy Colasurdo proclaimed, Fix My Life is "what "reality" television can be. It’s what it should be. Reaching for our best selves. Focusing on what can make our lives meaningful. Learning from others’ mistakes because they are so often our own. Having hard conversations." Colasurdo further recognizes Vanzant's gutsy, honest approach to handling difficult situations.

Critic Jon Caramanica proposes that Vanzant possesses "a mystical air but with a deeply grounded approach. She speaks in a soothing, encouraging voice, makes phenomenal eye contact and has an evident distaste for polish. Iyanla: Fix My Life is Intervention and daytime talk distilled to core principles. Much of the show is given over to long, hard conversations, shot up close, a tactic of discomfort." He goes on to critique that "her truth-teller presentation can go overboard at times: In a later episode, she literally ties family members together with string to illustrate how bonds work, then uses scissors to emphasize a point about abandonment. But mostly, it’s bracing watching her poke holes in the delusions of her charges."

Ratings
Zap2it reported that "the premiere of the new original series Iyanla: Fix My Life with life coach Iyanla Vanzant scored 1.18 W25-54 rating and 1,136,000 million viewers ranking No.2 in its time period in W25-54 among all ad-supported cable networks. The series posted triple digit growth (+808% W25-54, +952% total viewers) versus year ago numbers and built in the half hour, growing +5%. The premiere, which featured Basketball Wives star Evelyn Lozada, continued ratings momentum with part two scoring 1.73 W25-54 rating and 1,590,000 million total viewers, ranking No,3 in its time period among ad-supported cable in W25-54 and W18-49, posting quadruple digit growth (+1231% W25-54, +1506% total viewers) versus year ago numbers. The Sunday episode also ranked No.1 in the time slot across all broadcast and cable with African-American W25-54 (9.66) and W18-49 (9.12)."

Awards and nominations

References

External links
 
 
 

2010s American reality television series
2012 American television series debuts
Oprah Winfrey Network original programming
Television series by Harpo Productions
English-language television shows
2020s American reality television series
2021 American television series endings